The Vellaloor massacre refers to the killing of nearly 5,000 people of the Kallar clan at the Vellalore village near Melur Taluk in what is now the Madurai District in the Indian state of Tamil Nadu. The massacre was ordered by Captain Rumley of the East India Company. The murder of the Ka occurred, as they refused to pay taxes to the East India Company. The carnage is recorded in the 1767 annual gazette of the Madras Government.

The Kallars had been resisting paying taxes to the Company and the Carnatic Sultanate, and five battalions of sepoys (from the presidency armies) and 1,500 cavalry under Captain Rumley were sent by the Nabob of Arcot, Muhammad Ali Khan Wallajah, to extract taxes. The villages held defensive positions, and refused to pay the taxes. Captain Rumley ordered the village to be set on fire, and anyone escaping the fire (men, women and children) were killed by the Company sepoys. This resulted in more than 3000 being killed at Vellalapatti. This incident made other surrounding villages submit to the Company and pay their taxes.

After a while, there was another instance of rebellion by the Kallar, by attacks on the Company peons, which was followed by another massacre by Captain Rumley, resulting in the death of another 2,000 people.

These events were preceded by several instances of rebellion against paying taxation to Muslim polities and the East India Company by the Kallars. In 1755. Colonel Alexander Heron led an expedition against the Poligar of Kumaravadi, Lackenaig (Lakshmi Naik?), whose Governor Mayana had taken refugee at the temple of Kovilkudi, at Tirumbur Village. Heron and Yusuf Khan led a combined force in burning down the temple. In this incident, an idol revered by the Kallars were removed and held for a ransom of five thousand rupees. The Kallars being unable to pay, the idol was melted down. This act of Heron was condemned even by the Madras Council of the East India Company, as an action becoming unworthy of a British officer, and the prejudice that this act will cause among the natives about the Company.

Indian classical literature, including Tamil Sangam literature, memorialized only royalty and nobility, and hence this massacre of common people did not find a mention in contemporary literature of that period. However the incident has survived as folklore, and also in official records of the Madras Government.

Later references seem to suggest that Captain Rumley was imprisoned at Arnee, then moved to Seringapatam, and perished in imprisonment, in 1783, during the course of the Second Anglo-Mysore War (1780–1784).

References 

1767 in India
1767 murders in Asia
Madurai district
Massacres in 1767
Massacres in British India